Dilaver is a given name. Notable people with the name include:

Given name
Dilaver Pasha, Ottoman statesman
Dilaver Satılmış (born 1979), Swiss football player
Dilaver Zrnanović (born 1984), Bosnian footballer currently playing for Sloboda Tuzla
Dilaver "Dilly" Duka (born 1989), American footballer currently playing for Montreal Impact

Surname
Anıl Dilaver, Turkish footballer
Emir Dilaver, Bosnian footballer
Haris Dilaver, Bosnian footballer

Places
Dilaver, Akçakoca

See also
 Dilawar (disambiguation), further information

Turkish-language surnames
Turkish masculine given names